Achterwehr is an Amt ("collective municipality") in the district of Rendsburg-Eckernförde, in Schleswig-Holstein, Germany. The seat of the Amt is in Achterwehr.

Subdivision
The Amt Achterwehr consists of the following municipalities:

Achterwehr
Bredenbek 
Felde 
Krummwisch
Melsdorf 
Ottendorf 
Quarnbek 
Westensee

References 

Ämter in Schleswig-Holstein